Burrill with Cowling is a civil parish in the Hambleton District of North Yorkshire, England, including the villages of Burrill and Cowling.  It is only a 5-minute walk between the 2 small villages, which are 1 mile west of Bedale.  It is a small parish surrounded by sparsely populated countryside and contains mainly detached and semi-detached houses. The closest city is Ripon  and it is 234 miles from London.  Burrill with Cowling is accessible by road from the A1(M) 3.1 miles to the east and the nearest railway station is 15 miles away in Northallerton.

In 1870/72 John Marius Wilson described Burrill with Cowling as: 
"A township in Bedale parish, N. R. Yorkshire; 1¾ mile SW of Bedale. It has a post office, of the name of Burrell, under Bedale. Acres, 463. Real property, £1,415. Pop., 111. Houses, 25."

Demographics
According to the 2011 census Burrill with Cowling is a small parish with a population of 104 and only 50 households.  The average age of the population is 47.6.  Most of the inhabitants are of working age, with the highest percentage (33.7%) being in the 45–59 age range.  The second-biggest age group is 60+, with 32 people (30.1%), mirroring the ageing population in the country.  The smallest age group was 15- to 19-year-olds with only 3 people. Although the population has fluctuated slightly there has been little change since 1881, when the population was 100.

Economy and industry
In the 1800s Burrill with Cowling's main employment was agriculture, with 25 inhabitants working in farming in 1881. Agriculture is still the main employer, with 16.1% of all industry (10 people employed in this sector) and manufacturing being the second-largest employer with 8 people, whilst the two smallest sectors are 'Financial and Insurance Activities' and 'Information and Communication', both with 1.6% of the total number of employed. As of 2011 there were 84 people of working age with 60 of these being economically active, 2 students and 14 retired.

Listed buildings
Burrill with Cowling contains a handful of listed buildings; Ivy Cottage (Grade II listed on 22 August 1966), Manor House (Grade II listed on 5 May 1952)  and most notably Cowling Hall.
Cowling Hall is a Grade I listed building (22 August 1966) on Cowling Lane, Burrill, DL8 1RR.  The Hall is currently owned by the village and is run by a group of volunteers whilst being entirely self-funded, having opened on 1 December 2012 to be used for classes, youth clubs and social groups.  
It was in 1985 that the land the Hall now stands on was purchased with the aim of building 'The Cowling Liberal Club and Institute'.  It contained a reading room and library and was used for political and social gatherings. It has gone through many changes – mainly housing the 'Cowling Women's' Liberal Association'.  In 1939 membership of the club was declining therefore to keep the Hall open it was offered to the Cowling Parish Council as a gift and was opened as the Cowling Village Institute, but since 1971 it has been renamed Cowling Village Hall.

Housing
In 2011 there were 50 households in Burrill with Cowling (the highest since records began in 1901), 64% in detached and in 30% semi-detached homes.  The average number of people per household is 2.1 and the average number of rooms per house is 7.3 (bedrooms 3.4).  The average house price in Hambleton is £237,659 (with the average detached house selling for £306,397), only about £1,000 below the national average for the UK but still approximately £80,000 more than the region it lies in – Yorks and Humber - where the average is £157,157.

Geography and climate
Burrill with Cowling is in the North of England in the county North Yorkshire and is located between two national parks – Yorkshire Dales National Park and North York Moors National Park. It is 32.2 miles from Middlesbrough and 41 miles from York (41 miles).  Land in the North East slopes west to east therefore rivers flow eastwards, mainly from sources in the Pennines  which are part of the Yorkshire Dales National Park.
The average temperature for Burrill with Cowling is approximately 9.7 °C (31.1 °F, slightly lower than the UK average of 10.4 °C (51 °F).

References

Civil parishes in North Yorkshire